JS Amagiri (DD-154) is an  of the Japan Maritime Self-Defense Force. Amagiri is currently in active service, homeported in Maizuru, Kyoto, Japan.

Description

Armaments
Amagiri is equipped for combat and interception missions, and is primarily armed with anti-ship weapons. Amagiri carries two of the Mk-141 Guided Missile Launching System (GMLS), which are anti-ship missile systems. The ship is also fitted to be used against submarines. She also carries the Mk-32 Surface Vessel Torpedo Tubes (SVTT), which can be used as an anti-submarine weapon.  The ship has two of these systems abeam to starboard and to port. Amagiri is also fitted with an Oto-Melara 62-caliber gun to be used against sea and air targets.

Specifications
The ship can have up to 220 personnel on board. The ship is also fitted to accommodate for one aircraft. The ship's flight deck can be used to service a SH-60J9(K) Seahawk helicopter.

History
Amagiri was laid down on March 3, 1986, launched on September 9, 1987 and commissioned on February 28, 1989.

References

External links

Asagiri-class destroyers
Ships built by IHI Corporation
1987 ships